Fox Crime was a Southeast Asian pay television channel, owned by Fox Networks Group Asia Pacific, a subsidiary of Disney International Operations. The channel focuses on crime and investigation series programs. In India, Fox Crime Asia was replaced with its Indian counterpart in September 2012. Fox Crime India was shut down in July 2015 due to low ratings.

FOX Crime, along with Channel [V] channels ceased transmission on Unifi TV on 1 June 2018.

After over 15 years, Fox Crime (along with Fox, Fox Life, Channel [V], FX, Fox Movies, Fox Family Movies, Fox Action Movies, SCM Legend, Disney Channel, Disney Junior, Nat Geo People, Star Movies China, and five of its sports channels) were officially ceased broadcasting across Southeast Asia and Hong Kong on October 1, 2021. Most of these channel's shows were shifted to Disney+ (in Singapore, Philippines, Hong Kong and Taiwan) and Disney+ Hotstar (in Southeast Asia outside Singapore and Philippines).

Programming
 7 Deadly Sins
 Air Crash Investigation
 Alfred Hitchcock Presents
 American Crime
 Backstrom
 Body of Proof
 Border Security: America's Front Line
 Breakout
 Brotherhood
 Burn Notice
 Cold Squad
 Crime Town USA
 COPS
 CSI: Crime Scene Investigation
 CSI: Miami
 CSI: NY
 CSI: CYBER
 Chicago P.D.
 Dexter
 Dog Patrol
 Franklin & Bash
 FBI

 Gang Related
 Get Shorty
 Happily Never After
 Homicide Hunter
 I, Detective
 I Wouldn't Go In There
 Law & Order
 Law & Order: Criminal Intent
 Life on Mars
 Locked Up Abroad
 Luther
 Leo Mattei, Special Unit
 Monk
 Moonlighting
 Murder
 Movie Night
 Motorway Patrol
 My Strange Addiction
 Numb3rs
 Perception
 Police Women
 Psych
 Red Widow
 Stitchers
 The Glades
 The Kill Point
 The Listener
 The Man Who Made Us Fat
 The Man Who Made Us Spend
 The Man Who Made Us Thin
 The People v. O. J. Simpson: American Crime Story
 The Making Of the Mob
 Twin Peaks
 Wicked City

See also
 Fox Crime (Italy)

References

Disney television networks
Defunct television channels
Fox Networks Group
Television stations in Hong Kong
Television channels and stations established in 2006
Mass media in Southeast Asia
Cable television in Hong Kong
Television channel articles with incorrect naming style
Television channels and stations disestablished in 2021